Alda de Jesús Oliveira (born March 3, 1945) is a Brazilian composer and pedagogue.

Born in March 14, 1945, Salvador, Bahia, Brasil. Oliveira received two BA degrees from the Federal University of Bahia, one in performance in 1968 and one in music education three years later. In 1979 she earned her MA from Tufts University, and in 1986 she received a Ph. D. in music education from the University of Texas at Austin. She returned to the Federal University of Bahia to teach, in 1992 becoming the head of its school of music. She founded the Associação Brasileira de Educação Musical – ABEM (The Brazilian Association of Music Education) and served as its first president; she has also served on various educational boards and committees in Brazil. Long active in the International Society for Music Education, she has written a number of pedagogical works on the subject of music. Oliveira's compositional output is mainly for small ensembles, and includes much music for educational purposes.

References

1945 births
Living people
Brazilian women composers
Women classical composers
Brazilian classical composers
People from Bahia
Federal University of Bahia alumni
Tufts University alumni
University of Texas at Austin College of Education alumni
Brazilian music educators
20th-century Brazilian musicians
20th-century classical composers
21st-century Brazilian musicians
21st-century classical composers
Women music educators
20th-century women composers
21st-century women composers